J14 may refer to:

Roads 
 County Route J14 (California)
 Malaysia Federal Route J14

Vehicles 
 , a Visby-class destroyer of the Swedish Navy
 LNER Class J14, a British steam locomotive class
 Shenyang J-14, a speculated Chinese fighter jet

Other uses  
 J-14 (magazine), an American magazine
 Bacterial pneumonia
 Elongated triangular bipyramid, a Johnson solid (J14)